Kell & Rigby was an Australian construction company.

History
Kell & Rigby was founded in June 1910 by William Kell and Alexander Rigby in Burwood, Sydney. After starting in house building it delivered the landmark Grace Building in Sydney in 1930.

In June 2009 New South Wales-based builder Brisland was acquired. In February 2012 Kell & Rigby was placed in administration and subsequently liquidated. The liquidation was subject to the Inquiry into Construction Industry Insolvency in NSW.

Major projects
Notable projects undertaken included:

References

Companies based in Sydney
Construction and civil engineering companies established in 1910
Construction and civil engineering companies of Australia
2012 disestablishments in Australia
Australian companies established in 1910